Kiab (also Romanized as Kīāb and Kīyāb; also known as Kīeh Āb) is a village in Qahan Rural District, Khalajastan District, Qom County, Qom Province, Iran. At the 2006 census, its population was 26, in 11 families.

References 

Populated places in Qom Province